Notiopsyllopus is a genus of mites in the family Acaridae.

Species
 Notiopsyllopus segermanae Fain, 1977

References

Acaridae